The American sitcom Friends was created by David Crane and Marta Kauffman, and produced by Bright/Kauffman/Crane Productions in association with Warner Bros. Television for NBC. The series began with the pilot episode, which was broadcast on September 22, 1994; the series finished its ten-season run on May 6, 2004, with 236 episodes. On average, they are 22–23 minutes long, for a 30-minute time slot including commercial breaks.

The series narrative follows six friends living and working in New York City: Rachel Green, Monica Geller, Phoebe Buffay, Joey Tribbiani, Chandler Bing, and Ross Geller played by Jennifer Aniston, Courteney Cox, Lisa Kudrow, Matt LeBlanc, Matthew Perry, and David Schwimmer respectively. All episodes were filmed at Warner Bros. Studios in Burbank, California. The fourth season finale, "The One with Ross's Wedding", however, was filmed on location in London, UK in front of a British studio audience.

In addition to the episodes, three specials were produced. In Friends: The Stuff You've Never Seen, broadcast following "The One with Joey's New Brain" on February 15, 2001, Conan O'Brien hosted a light-hearted discussion with the main cast on the Central Perk set – the fictional coffee house which featured prominently in the series. The special introduced outtakes from past episodes. The two-part retrospective special The One with All the Other Ones was broadcast before the one-hour series finale "The Last One" on May 6, 2004, and features clips from past episodes and interviews with the cast. All episodes have been released on VHS, DVD, Blu-ray, Netflix, and HBO Max.

Series overview

Episodes

Season 1 (1994–95)

Season 2 (1995–96)

Season 3 (1996–97)

Season 4 (1997–98)

Season 5 (1998–99)

Season 6 (1999–2000)

Season 7 (2000–01)

Season 8 (2001–02)

Season 9 (2002–03)

Season 10 (2003–04)

  denotes a "super-sized" 40-minute episode (with advertisements; actual runtime around 28 minutes).

Friends: The Reunion (2021)

Ratings
The large spike in season 2 is for the double episode "The One After the Superbowl" which aired after Super Bowl XXX.

Notes

References

General

Further reading

External links
 
 

 
Lists of American romance television series episodes
Lists of American sitcom episodes
American entertainers
American 3D films